Nuno Miguel Barbosa Morais (born 29 January 1984) is a Portuguese former professional footballer. Mainly a defensive midfielder, he could also appear as a central defender.

He was signed by Chelsea in 2004, but stayed only two years with the club, going on to spend the vast majority of his career with APOEL and win 16 major titles, including nine Cypriot First Division championships.

Football career

Chelsea
Born in Penafiel, Porto District, Morais started his career at his hometown club F.C. Penafiel, but in August 2004 was signed by England's Chelsea for an undisclosed fee on a three-year contract, after a successful trial period. He made his debut for the latter in an FA Cup win against Scunthorpe United in January 2005, playing the full 90 minutes. His first Premier League appearance occurred on 10 May, as a late substitute in a 3–1 away victory over Manchester United.

Due to the fact that Morais struggled to get first team action in his first season, he was loaned to C.S. Marítimo in 2005–06, alongside compatriot Filipe Oliveira. In that summer, he appeared twice for the Portuguese under-21s at the 2006 UEFA European Under-21 Championship on home soil, with Oliveira.

APOEL

Returning to Chelsea, Morais only appeared twice in the league, totalling less than 20 minutes in home draws against Manchester United and Everton and playing three times between the FA Cup and the Football League Cup. On 11 May 2007, he signed a two-year deal with Cypriot champions APOEL FC on a free transfer.

Morais was converted to a defensive midfielder during his time in Nicosia, and signed a new contract until June 2012. Since his debut he was an essential defensive unit as the side won, amongst other trophies, nine championships, three cups and four super cups; he also appeared in all six group-stage matches of the club in its first participation in the UEFA Champions League.

In the 2011–12 Champions League, Morais was an undisputed starter for the side as they reached the quarter-finals for the first time ever, playing all ten fixtures – including the round-of-16 defeat of Olympique Lyonnais where he converted his attempt in the penalty shootout. On 4 May 2012, he agreed to a three-year extension to his link.

During 2013–14, Morais appeared in every group stage game in APOEL's UEFA Europa League campaign, and scored the 2–1 winner against FC Girondins de Bordeaux at GSP Stadium. The following season, he was also first-choice in his team's Champions League campaign.

On 7 May 2016, following a league match against Apollon Limassol FC, Morais reached 251 for APOEL and became the foreigner with the most appearances in the history of the Cypriot top division. On 16 August, after playing against F.C. Copenhagen in the Champions League play-off round, he reached a club-best 81 games in European competitions.

Morais retired in July 2019, at the age of 35. He finished his career as APOEL's highest appearance maker of all time, with 524 matches to his name.

Club statistics

Honours
Chelsea
FA Cup: 2006–07
Football League Cup: 2006–07

APOEL
Cypriot First Division: 2008–09, 2010–11, 2012–13, 2013–14, 2014–15, 2015–16, 2016–17, 2017–18, 2018–19
Cypriot Cup: 2007–08, 2013–14, 2014–15
Cypriot Super Cup: 2008, 2009, 2011, 2013

References

External links
APOEL official profile

1984 births
Living people
People from Penafiel
Sportspeople from Porto District
Portuguese footballers
Association football defenders
Association football midfielders
Association football utility players
Primeira Liga players
Liga Portugal 2 players
F.C. Penafiel players
C.S. Marítimo players
Premier League players
Chelsea F.C. players
Cypriot First Division players
APOEL FC players
Portugal youth international footballers
Portugal under-21 international footballers
Portugal B international footballers
Portuguese expatriate footballers
Expatriate footballers in England
Expatriate footballers in Cyprus
Portuguese expatriate sportspeople in England
Portuguese expatriate sportspeople in Cyprus